Big Bad Wolf is a 2006 American werewolf-themed horror film about Derek Cowley, where he and his college classmates go to his stepfather's cabin to party. It won the 2007 Silver Award at WorldFest Houston in the category of Best Science Fiction/Fantasy/Horror Film. The film starred Trevor Duke as Derek Cowley, and Kimberly J. Brown as Samantha Marche. It was rated R in the United States for strong violence, gore, language, and nudity.

Plot
Two men are hunting in the jungle of Cameroon when one from another group of two people calls and says that his guide is missing. Then one can hear on the radio that someone is being attacked by what sounds like a wild animal. A humanoid creature rips the leg off of one of the men. The man's brother, Charlie Crowley finds his brother dying.

Years later, Charlie's nephew Derek has been living with emotional abuse from Mitch Toblat after Mitch married his mother. In spite of this Derek is going up to his stepfather's cabin with his friend Samantha and his four other friends while Mitch is on a business trip. After spending five hours searching for the cabin, they finally find it. That night the cabin is surprisingly attacked by a werewolf, and they are more surprised to find that it talks. The werewolf kills two of Derek's friends and breaks into one of the locked rooms of the cabin where it rapes one of the girls in front of her boyfriend, before killing her. The werewolf then castrates the boyfriend and kills him too. Derek and Sam both manage to escape the werewolf and are found by police.

They tell the police they didn't get a good look at what attacked them, knowing that they wouldn't believe them. The next day, Mitch picks Derek up from the police station, and tells Derek that the deaths of his friends are on him for taking his friends to the cabin in the first place. Sam and Derek both suspect that Mitch is the werewolf. Later Charlie pays Derek a visit to see if he's alright.

Derek and Sam confide what they know to Charlie, who surprisingly believes them. Charlie explains that he shot at the werewolf that killed his brother and suspected it to be Mitch as Mitch had a crush on Derek's mother. Charlie also says they just can't accuse Mitch, and need DNA evidence to be compared to the hair sample he got from the werewolf. Meanwhile, Charlie reconnects with Derek's mother while Derek and Sam become romantically connected themselves. While searching for DNA evidence, Sam enters Mitch's room and picks hair from his comb. Mitch catches Sam in his room and forces her to perform oral sex on him, and Sam takes the semen sample as DNA. Derek finds out and it puts a strain on Sam and his relationship.

Meanwhile, Mitch has been stalking Charlie, suspecting that he is sweet on his wife. Mitch picks up a package addressed to Charlie, and learns it is the DNA results. Mitch later abducts Charlie and reveals to him that he doesn't need the moon to change, that he learned to control himself to the extent that he can transform at will. Mitch beats, tortures, mutilates and finally kills Charlie, saying it is his own fault for not minding his business. Derek later finds the DNA report and learns that Mitch has killed Charlie, Derek confronts Mitch about it. Mitch tries to justify himself but Derek shoots down his arguments. Around the same time, Derek's mother decides to leave Mitch. In retaliation, Mitch kidnaps Sam and demands Derek to meet him in the cabin that night, alone.

Derek arrives, but another group of teenagers go to the cabin to investigate the previous massacre (a running gag in the film). Mitch transforms and kills them one at a time, including raping a girl in their group. When it is down to Derek and Sam, they fight Mitch with silver knives and arrows. Eventually, they set Mitch on fire and the cabin burns down. After escaping the fire, Derek and Sam embrace, but Mitch is not dead and bites Derek, before being stabbed one last time. As he dies, Mitch says "my curse is now yours". Derek worries about his future after all he went through, but Sam promises to stick by him whatever happens, and they drive off together on her moped.

After the credits end, Mitch is shown moving his fingers slightly.

Cast
 Trevor Duke as Derek Cowley
 Kimberly J. Brown as Samantha "Sam" Marche
 Richard Tyson as Mitchell Toblat/The Beast
 Sarah Aldrich as Gwen Cowley
 David Naughton as Sheriff Ruben
 Christopher Shyer as Charlie Cowley
 Andrew Bowen as Scott Cowley
 Sarah Christine Smith as Cassie
 Robin Sydney as Melissa

References

External links
2007 Audio Interview at Your Video Store Shelf with the director of Big Bad Wolf Lance W. Dreesen
 

2006 films
2006 horror films
American comedy horror films
American werewolf films
American exploitation films
American splatter films
2000s English-language films
2000s American films
American black comedy films
American monster movies
American supernatural horror films